The Tiia Reima Award is an ice hockey trophy seasonally awarded by the Finnish Ice Hockey Association to the top goal scorer of the Naisten Liiga regular season. It is named after Tiia Reima, one of the trailblazers of women's ice hockey in Finland and sole possessor of fifth on the list of all-time goals in the Naisten Liiga (called  during 1982 to 2017), though she was never the single-season top goal scorer in the league.

Award winners 
G = goals; GP = games played; G/GP = goals per game''

Source: Elite Prospects

All time award winners

References

Naisten Liiga (ice hockey) trophies and awards